Lucy Hamilton Hooper (Jones; January 20, 1835 – August 31, 1893) was an American poet, journalist, editor, playwright, and translator. Soon after her marriage in 1854, a commercial crisis ruined her husband's business and she was compelled to start writing professionally. She contributed regularly to newspapers and magazines, and was associate editor of Our Daily Fare, issued in connection with the fair held by the U.S. Sanitary Commission in Philadelphia in 1864, and to which she presented the first hundred copies of a small collection of her poems published in that year. She was associate editor of Lippincott's Monthly Magazine from its establishment in 1868 until 1870, when she made her first trip to Europe.

She was the author of, Poems with Translations from the German of Geibel and Others (1864); Poems (1871); The Nabob, translated from the French of Alphonse Daudet by special agreement with Daudet (1878); Under the Tricolor; or the American Colony in Paris, novel (1880); The Tsar's Widow, novel (1881). She also wrote two plays: Helen's inheritance, which was produced at the Theatre d'Application, Paris, in 1888, at the Madison Square Theatre, New York, in 1889, and toured the United States for several seasons under the title Inherited; and Her Living Image, in collaboration with a French dramatist.

Early life and education 
Lucy Hamilton Jones was born in Philadelphia, Pennsylvania, January 20, 1835. She was the daughter of Bataile Muse Jones, a well-known merchant of that city.

While attending school, Hooper contributed verses to Godey's Lady's Book.

Career 
In 1854, she married Robert E. Hooper, a native of Philadelphia, and resided in that city for several years. Her first poems, written, at a very early age, were published in Godey's Lady's Book. In 1864, a small collection of her poems was published by Frederick Leypoldt, the first 100 copies of the edition being presented by the author to the Great Central Fair for the benefit of the United States Sanitary Commission, which was then in progress in Philadelphia. The publication of Lippincott's Monthly Magazine began in 1868, and Hooper became a constant contributor. She assumed the functions of assistant editor of that periodical, a post which she retained till her visit to Europe, in 1870. In 1871, a second collection of her poems was published, including most of those that had been printed in the first volume, with important additions.

Hooper contributed a large number of stories, articles and poems to the leading American periodicals for more than 20 years. Though born to great wealth, Hooper was compelled to become a writer as a profession because of a commercial crisis. Her husband was appointed vice-consul general in Paris in 1874, and she became Paris correspondent for the Philadelphia Evening Telegraph, the Baltimore Gazette, the American issue of the Art Journal, Appleton's Journal, Lippineott's Magazine, the St. Louis Post-Dispatch, and the Paris American Register. She was a regular contributor to the Philadelphia Evening Telegraphfor 16 years, and of the St. Louis Post-Dispatch. 

She was the author of a translation of Alphonse Daudet's novel, The Nabob, which was published by special agreement with Daudet. She was known for her translations of German poetry and published several works translated from Johann Wolfgang von Goethe, Emanuel Geibel, Friedrich Schiller and Christian Friedrich Hebbel. An original novel, called Under the Tricolor, and a four-act drama, entitled Helen's Inheritance, were other literary works of important character. The latter was first produced in June, 1888, in a French version, in the Théâtre d'Application, in Paris, Nettie Hooper playing the part of the heroine, continuing in the role when the piece was brought out by A. M. Palmer in the Madison Square Theatre, in New York City, in December, 1889. The drama was produced under another title, Inherited, throughout the U.S. for several seasons.

Personal life 
Hooper made her home in Paris, France, where she died August 31, 1893. She was buried at Laurel Hill Cemetery, Philadelphia.

Bibliography 
Poems: With Translations from the German of Geibel and Others., Frederick Leypoldt, Philadelphia, 1864
Poems, J.B. Lippincott & Co., 1871
Under the Tricolor: Or, The American Colony in Paris. A Novel., J.B. Lippincott & Co., Philadelphia, 1880
The Tsar's Window, Roberts Brothers, Boston, 1881
Those Pretty St. George Girls. A Society Novel., T.B. Peterson & Brothers, Philadelphia, 1883

References

Citations

Attribution

Sources

External links 
 
 

1835 births
1893 deaths
19th-century American newspaper editors
19th-century American poets
19th-century American women writers
American women journalists
American women poets
Burials at Laurel Hill Cemetery (Philadelphia)
Wikipedia articles incorporating text from A Woman of the Century
Women newspaper editors
Writers from Philadelphia